Isodemis ngoclinha is a moth of the family Tortricidae. It is found in Vietnam.
The wingspan is 23 mm. The ground colour of the forewings is cream scaled pinkish rust, but more grey in the dorsal area and markedly brownish in the mid-terminal portion. The markings in the costal area are olive brown. The hindwings are brownish.

Etymology
The name refers to the type locality, Ngọc Linh, Vietnam.

References

Moths described in 2009
Archipini
Moths of Asia
Taxa named by Józef Razowski